Frederick Parker (18 June 1886 – 5 January 1963), also known as Spider Parker or Bassie Parker, was an English professional footballer who played as a forward in the Football League for Clapton Orient. He was the first person to enlist in the Football Battalion during the First World War. He later served as manager of Folkestone.

Personal life 
Parker was married with five children. During his early football career, he worked as a carter on the Isle of Portland. Parker served as a colour sergeant with the Football Battalion of the Middlesex Regiment during the First World War. As captain of Clapton Orient, he was the first person to enlist in the newly formed battalion in December 1914. Parker suffered with trench foot in 1917 and was lightly wounded in April 1918. After his retirement from football, Parker worked as a porter at London King's Cross railway station and as a cleaner at government offices. Following his death in January 1963, he was buried in Southgate Cemetery.

Career statistics

References

1886 births
1963 deaths
English footballers
English Football League players
Association football inside forwards
Leyton Orient F.C. players
Folkestone F.C. managers
Sportspeople from Weymouth
Footballers from Dorset
British Army personnel of World War I
Middlesex Regiment soldiers
English football managers
Southern Football League players
Western Football League players
Weymouth F.C. players
Association football outside forwards
Salisbury City F.C. (1905) players
Folkestone F.C. players
Southern Football League managers
Leyton Orient F.C. non-playing staff
Military personnel from Dorset